Mr. Children 1996–2000, is a compilation album by Mr. Children, released on July 11, 2001.

This is a compilation of selected album and single tracks from 1996 to 2000, released on the same day as Mr. Children 1992–1995. It is the eleventh best-selling album of 2001 in Japan, according to Oricon.

Track listing
 名もなき詩(Namonaki Uta) – 5:31
 花 -Memento-Mori- – 4:49
 Mirror – 3:02
 Everything (It's you) – 5:24
 ALIVE – 6:43
 ニシエヒガシエ(Nishi e Higashi e) – 5:00
 光の射す方へ(Hikari no sasu hō e) – 6:53
 終わりなき旅(Owarinaki Tabi) – 7:09
 ラララ(La la la) – 5:23
  – 5:10
  – 5:50
 NOT FOUND – 4:56
 Hallelujah – 6:47

Mr. Children albums
2001 compilation albums

Mr.Children 1992–1995